The 1991 McDonald's All-American Boys Game was an All-star basketball game played on Saturday, April 6, 1991, at the Springfield Civic Center in Springfield, Massachusetts. The game's rosters featured the best and most highly recruited high school boys graduating in 1991. The game was the 14th annual version of the McDonald's All-American Game first played in 1978.

1991 game
The game was telecast live by CBS. The rosters were full of talented forwards: the forward position was the most represented among the top ranked recruits of the 1991 class. Only Cory Alexander and Donyell Marshall were still undecided about their college choice. 4 All-Americans of the West team had committed to Michigan and went on to be part of the so-called Fab Five: Howard, King, Rose and Webber. Chris Webber also won the MVP award, along with Rick Brunson. While Brunson showcased his all-around skills by recording 19 points, 7 rebounds and 6 assists, Webber was instrumental in the West comeback in the second half, and gave his team the victory with a slam dunk with 6 seconds left on the game clock. Webber ended the game with 28 points and 12 rebounds. Other players who starred were Glenn Robinson (20 points/8 rebounds), James Forrest (22 and 10), Don Williams (20 points) and Juwan Howard (16). Of the 20 players, 15 went on to play at least 1 game in the NBA.

East roster

West roster

Coaches
The East team was coached by:
 Head Coach Ray Mullis of The Cardinal Gibbons School (Baltimore, Maryland)

The West team was coached by:
 Head Coach Frank LaPorte of St. Joseph Notre Dame High School (Alameda, California)

All-American Week

Contest winners 
 The 1991 Slam Dunk contest was won by Jimmy King.
 The 1991 3-point shoot-out was won by Sharone Wright.

References

External links
McDonald's All-American on the web
McDonald's All-American all-time rosters
McDonald's All-American rosters at Basketball-Reference.com
Game stats at Realgm.com

1990–91 in American basketball
1991
1991 in sports in Massachusetts
1991
Sports competitions in Springfield, Massachusetts
Springfield